Bolshoye Skretneye Ramenye is a rural locality (a village) in Yenangskoye Rural Settlement, Kichmengsko-Gorodetsky District, Vologda Oblast, Russia. The population was 1 as of 2002.

Geography 
Bolshoye Skretneye Ramenye is located 58 km southeast of Kichmengsky Gorodok (the district's administrative centre) by road. Maloye Skretneye Ramenye is the nearest rural locality.

References 

Rural localities in Kichmengsko-Gorodetsky District